Rolie Polie Olie is a computer-animated children's television series produced by Nelvana and created by William Joyce. The show focuses on a little robot who is composed of several spheres and other three-dimensional geometric shapes. The show was one of the earliest series that was fully animated in CGI. Rolie Polie Olie was broadcast from October 4, 1998, to April 28, 2004 and later reran on Disney Junior from March 23, 2012, until September 28, 2014. The series was followed by two straight-to-video films based on the series (The Great Defender of Fun and The Baby Bot Chase), in 2002 and 2003 respectively.

Rolie Polie Olie won a Gemini Award in Canada for "Best Animated Program" in 1999. The show also won a Daytime Emmy Award for "Outstanding Special Class Animated Program" in 2000 and 2005. William Joyce won a 1999 Daytime Emmy for Best Production Design for this series. The show has a vintage atmosphere, with futuristic elements.

The first five seasons were made available on Disney+ in the United States on September 29, 2021.

Synopsis
The show focuses on the Polie family, who live in a teapot-shaped house in a geometric world (Planet Polie) populated by robot-based characters. The stories revolve around a young robot named Olie learning life lessons and going on wacky adventures (either real or imaginative) while growing up. These often include his younger sister Zowie, his inventor father, his hard-working mother, his fun-loving grandfather Pappy, and his dog Spot. Although most of the main cast consists of circular bots, other characters are featured in other shapes, such as Olie's friend Billy Bevel and his family, who are square-shaped bots from Planet Cubey.

Characters
 Olie Polie – A robot boy and the show's main character. He is very friendly, inquisitive, and loves his family and friends.
 Zowie Polie (pronounced "Zoey") – Olie's younger sister, Gizmo's niece, Pappy's granddaughter and Percy and Polina's daughter. She is also very inquisitive (The episode But Why?, for example, has her keep on annoying the family by asking "Why?" about everything imaginable) and loud. She loves Olie and enjoys emulating him, sometimes to Olie's chagrin, too.
 Spot – Spot is Olie's faithful dog. As revealed in the episode But Why?, as well as Spot's Birthday, he was given his name because he left a "spot" on the carpet as a puppy.
 Mr. Percy Polie – Olie and Zowie's father and Pappy's younger son. He is an inventor, similar to G2 Droid from Star Tours, whose various inventions frequently get out of hand and gets him and the family into trouble.
 Mrs. Polina Polie – Olie and Zowie's mother. and Percy's wife. She is a homemaker.
 Pappy Polie – Percy and Gizmo's father, Polina's father-in-law and Olie and Zowie's paternal grandfather. He runs a farm by himself and is best known for his unruly dentures.
 Billy Bevel – Olie's best friend. He lives next door. He is a cube shaped boy who, along with his family, is originally from Planet Cubey.
 Gizmo Polie – Olie and Zowie's paternal uncle who is also Percy's older brother, Polina's brother-in-law and Pappy's older son. He rides a motorcycle named Motorboy, and he also has an Elvis Presley like impression.
 Aunt Polie-Anna – Olie and Zowie's paternal great aunt, Pappy's sister, Percy and Gizmo's aunt and Polina's aunt-in-law who appears in The Baby Bot Chase and in Season 6.
 Baxter and Bonita Jaquita Bevel – Billy's parents. Baxter wears glasses and has a surprisingly deep laugh, despite having a somewhat high-pitched voice. Bonita is an accomplished dancer and acts similar to her husband. They are friends of Mr. and Mrs. Polie.
 Space Boy – A young super-hero and star of Olie's favorite TV show Space Boy. Along with his companion Space Dog, he frequently saves the universe from various threats on his show, and occasionally appears to help out Olie. Both Space Boy and Space Dog resemble Olie and Spot, with the main difference being that Space Boy and Space Dog are blue and silver, and Olie and Spot are yellow and brown.
 Coochie and Coo Polie – Olie and Zowie's adoptive baby twin brother and sister. They first appeared in the movie The Baby Bot Chase and the Season 6 episodes.
 Binky Bevel – Billy's baby brother. His head has the ability to spin when his belly button is pressed in. He is best friends with Zowie. At first, Zowie was jealous of Binky and did not want to get along with him. But soon they became friends.
 Screwy – A new kid in town, specifically being a lugnut. In his early appearances, Screwy acts as a bully towards Olie and his friends; one episode had Olie actually driven to punch him. However, Screwy quickly became a member of the gang.
 Pollie Pi – A red-haired female classmate and friend of Olie and Billy. She first appeared in the Valentine's Day–themed episode Looove Bug, where she moves into Polieville, and Olie and Billy, who compete with each other for Pollie's affections, immediately fell in love (via being bitten by the Love Bug) with her until they bumped into Mr. Polie. Pollir owns a pink poodle named Fifi.
 Wheelie – An older kid with a single wheel instead of legs due to the fact of him being a "Roll Bot." He is very athletic and acts as a sort of mentor towards Olie and Billy.
 Dicey – Billy's pet cat. She is often chased by Spot. She is an orange cat with a body that, as her name implies, resembles two dice.
 Mrs. Ethel Triangle – Olie's teacher. She has a triangular hairstyle, body and, earrings.
 Big Gene Green and Little Gene Green – Two aliens from the Little Green Planet who accidentally crash–landed on Polieville and befriended Olie and his family. They reappear when Olie and his dad visit their planet, only to find it much too small for their comfort. They are notable for the way they often 'backward speak' sentences similar to Yoda.
 Chuck Squarey – A pop musician who, like the Bevells, is from Planet Cubey. His song and dance, "The Twirl," is a major hit around the galaxy. He is apparently friends with his fans, the Bevels and the Polies.
 Klanky Klaus – The show's equivalent of Santa Claus, he lives on his own planet, Chillsville.
 Gloomius Maximus – An evil space pirate who can stop the fun, and make the universe gloomy, hence his name. He is the main villain in The Great Defender of Fun and makes a few appearances on the show during Season 6 as reformed character.

Voice cast
 Cole Caplan as Olie
 Kristen Bone as Zowie, Cutie Doll
 Joshua Tucci as Billy Bevel (seasons 1–5)
 Kristopher Clarke as Billy Bevel (season 6)
 Robert Norman Smith as Spot, Space Dog, TV Announcer
 Adrian Truss as Mr. Polie, Uncle Gizmo, TV Announcer, Pappy Star, TV Host
 Andrew Craig as Chunk Squarey
 Kylie Fairlie as Space Boy, Little Dad
 Neil Crone as Dr. Geary (The Great Defender of Fun)
 Catherine Disher as Mrs. Polie, Hammy Lady, TV Contestant, Tape Voice
 Len Carlson as Pappy, TV Announcer, Dr. Callinghouse, Space Boy Announcer, Chef Rotundo, Radio Announcer, Spookie Ookie, TV Announcer 2, TV Detective, TV Host
 Tedde Moore as Aunt Polie-Anna
 Noah Reid as Screwy
 Jake Goldsbie as Junior Littlegreen
 Julie Lemieux as Coochie, Coo, Clock Mouse (season 6)
 Scott McCord as Cuckoo
 Jennifer Gould as Miss Triangle
 Ellen Ray Hennessy as Bonita
 Rebecca Brenner as Pollie Pi
 Philip Williams as Baxter, TV Announcer
 Michael Cera as Little Gizmo
 Sunday Muse as Binky, Bogey Bot
 Richard Binsley as Dicey, Gene Littlegreen
 Howard Jerome as Klanky Claus (seasons 2–5)
 John Neville as Klanky Claus (season 6)
 Al Mukadam as Wheelie
 Rick Jones as TV Announcer
 Tracey Moore - Clock Mouse (seasons 1–5), Lady Bug
 Susan Roman - Fifi
 Ron Pardo - TV Actor
 Juan Chioran - Willy Jolly
 Elizabeth Hanna - Kindly Lady
 Ron Rubin - Bot-ler, Lunchbox, TV Announcer
 Paul Haddad - Gloomius Maximus

Episodes

References

External links
 
 
 

1998 Canadian television series debuts
2004 Canadian television series endings
1998 French television series debuts
2004 French television series endings
Disney animated television series
1990s Canadian animated television series
2000s Canadian animated television series
1990s French animated television series
2000s French animated television series
1990s preschool education television series
2000s preschool education television series
Animated preschool education television series
Canadian children's animated television series
Canadian preschool education television series
French children's animated television series
French preschool education television series
Television series by Nelvana
Disney Channel original programming
CBC Television original programming
Television series by Disney
Treehouse TV original programming
Channel 5 (British TV channel) original programming
Disney Junior original programming
Animated television series about robots
Canadian Screen Award-winning television shows
Daytime Emmy Award for Outstanding Animated Program winners
Canadian computer-animated television series
French computer-animated television series
Canadian television shows based on children's books
French television shows based on children's books